A Minister of State is a mid-tier Minister of the Crown in the UK government.

Hierarchy
Ministers of State are junior to the Prime Minister and Secretaries of State, but senior to a Parliamentary Under Secretary of State and Parliamentary Private Secretary. The office is defined in the House of Commons Disqualification Act 1975 as "...a member of Her Majesty’s Government in the United Kingdom who neither has charge of any public department nor holds any other of the offices specified in Schedule 2 to this Act or any office in respect of which a salary is payable out of money provided by Parliament under section 3(1)(b) of the Ministerial and other Salaries Act 1975".

History
The designation was first made in 1941 for Lord Beaverbrook, who was a member of the War Cabinet and was tasked with creating the Ministry of Production. His successors were effectively Ministers without Portfolio, but this changed in 1950 when the first junior minister was appointed to that designation, in the Foreign Office, to release some burden from the then-Foreign Secretary.

Duties
Ministers of State take charge of a particular part of their department and undertake specific delegated duties. To help to identify these duties, since the 1970s Ministers of State have often been granted a courtesy title which includes the word "for" (rather than "of").

Current Ministers of State
The current Ministers of State are:

 HM Treasury
 Minister of State for Efficiency and Transformation (joint with Cabinet Office)
 Foreign, Commonwealth and Development Office
 Minister of State for Foreign Affairs
 Minister of State for Middle East and North Africa
 Minister of State for Pacific and the Environment (joint with Department for Environment, Food and Rural Affairs)
 Minister of State for Asia
 Minister of State for South Asia and the Commonwealth
 Home Office
 Minister of State for Security
 Minister of State for Crime and Policing (joint with Ministry of Justice)
 Minister of State for Home Affairs (United Kingdom)
 Minister of State for Building Safety and Communities
 Cabinet Office
 Minister of State for the Constitution and Devolution
 Minister of State for Efficiency and Transformation (joint with HM Treasury)
 Minister of State
 Ministry of Justice
 Minister of State for Prisons
 Minister of State for Crime and Policing (joint with Home Office)
 Ministry of Defence
Minister of State for Defence Procurement
Minister of State for Defence
 Department of Health and Social Care
 Minister of State for Health
 Minister of State for Social Care
 Minister of State for Patient Safety, Suicide Prevention and Mental Health
 Department for Business, Energy and Industrial Strategy
 Minister of State for Business, Energy and Clean Growth
 Department for International Trade
 Minister of State for Trade Policy
 Department for Work and Pensions
 Minister of State for Disabled People, Health and Work
 Department for Education
 Minister of State for Universities
 Minister of State for School Standards
 Department for Environment, Food and Rural Affairs
 Minister of State for Pacific and the Environment (joint with Foreign, Commonwealth and Development Office)
 Ministry of Housing, Communities and Local Government
 Minister of State for Regional Growth and Local Government
 Minister of State for Housing
 Minister of State for Building Safety and Communities
 Department for Transport
 Minister of State
 Minister of State
 Northern Ireland Office
Minister of State for Northern Ireland
 Department for Digital, Culture, Media and Sport
 Minister of State for Digital and Culture
 Minister of State for Media and Data

Historic Ministers of State
Department of Energy and Climate Change
Minister of State at the Department of Energy and Climate Change
Department for Exiting the European Union
Minister of State for Exiting the European Union
Department for International Development
Minister of State for International Development
Technology
Minister of State for Technology
Scotland
Minister of State for Scotland

References

Ministerial offices in the United Kingdom